Nader Mohammadkhani (born August 23, 1963 in Tehran) is a retired Iranian football player.

He played for the Iran national football team and was a participant at the 1998 FIFA World Cup. On 21 January 2000 he officially retired at half-time during a testimonial match (Iran vs Asia All-Stars).

Honours

Club
Persepolis
Tehran Province League (2): 1987-88, 1990–91
Asian Cup Winners' Cup (1): 1990-91
Iranian Football League (2): 1998–99, 1999–2000
Hazfi Cup (2): 1987–88, 1998–99
Bahman
Hazfi Cup (1): 1994–95

National
Iran
Asian Games Gold Medal (2): 1990, 1998

Career statistics

International goals

References

External Links

1963 births
Living people
Iranian footballers
Persepolis F.C. players
qatar SC players
pas players
Sanat Naft Abadan F.C. players
Association football defenders
Iranian expatriate footballers
1988 AFC Asian Cup players
1992 AFC Asian Cup players
1998 FIFA World Cup players
Iran international footballers
Keshavarz players
Bahman players
Asian Games gold medalists for Iran
Asian Games medalists in football
Footballers at the 1990 Asian Games
Footballers at the 1994 Asian Games
Footballers at the 1998 Asian Games
Medalists at the 1990 Asian Games
Medalists at the 1998 Asian Games